Johanna is a feminine name, a variant form of Joanna that originated in Latin in the Middle Ages, including an -h- by analogy with the Latin masculine name Johannes. The original Greek form Iōanna lacks a medial /h/ because in Greek /h/ could only occur initially. For more information on the name's origin, see the article on Joanna.

Women named Johanna
Johanna Allik (born 1994), Estonian figure skater
Johanna van Ammers-Küller (1884–1966), Dutch writer
Johanna "Hannah" Arendt (1906–1975), German-born American political theorist
Johanna "Jo" Bauer-Stumpff (1873–1964), Dutch painter
Johanna Sophia of Bavaria (c.1373–1410), Duchess consort of Austria
Johanna Beisteiner (born 1976), Austrian classical guitarist
Johanna Berglind (1816–1903), Swedish sign language educator
Jóhanna Bergmann Þorvaldsdóttir, Icelandic farmer
Johanna "Annie" Bos (1886–1975), Dutch theater and silent film actress
Johanna van Brabant (1322–1406), Duchess of Brabant
Johanna Braddy (born 1987), American actress
Johanna Corleva (1698–1752), Dutch translator and linguist
Johanna Eleonora De la Gardie (1661–1708), Swedish writer
Johanna Martina Duyvené de Wit (born 1946), Dutch writer with the pseudonym Tessa de Loo
Johanna Edwards (born 1978), American novelist
Johanna Fateman (born 1974), American musician, writer and editor
Johanna Griggs (born 1973), Australian sportsperson and television personality
Johanna van Gogh-Bonger (1862–1925), Dutch art dealer, sister-in-law of Vincent van Gogh
Johanna Hedén (1837–1912), Swedish obstetrician
Johanna Helena Herolt (1668–1723), German-born Dutch still-life painter
Johanna Jachmann-Wagner (1828–1894), German mezzo-soprano
Johanna Kirchner (1889–1944), German opponent of the Nazi régime
Johanna Koerten (1650–1715), Dutch silhouette cutter
Johanna Konta (born 1991), British tennis player
Johanna "Joke" van Leeuwen (born 1952), Dutch author, illustrator, and cabaret performer
Johanna "Anneke" Levelt Sengers (born 1929), Dutch physicist
Johanna Lind (born 1971), 1993 Miss Sweden
Johanna Dorothea Lindenaer (1664–1737), Dutch writer
Johanna Lindsey (1952–2019), American author of romance novels
Johanna Löfblad (1733–1811), Swedish actress
Johanna Loisinger (1865–1951), opera singer
Johanna Long (born 1992), racing driver
Johanna "Hanja" Maij-Weggen (born 1943), Dutch government minister
Johanna Mestorf (1828–1909), German prehistoric archaeologist and museum curator
Johanna Nichols (born 1945), American paleolinguist
Johanna van Polanen (1392–1445), Dutch noblewoman
Johanna Ray, American casting director and producer
Johanna Reiss (born 1932), Dutch-born American writer
Johanna Rosaly (born 1948), Puerto Rican actress
Johanna C.M. "Jolande" Sap (born 1963), Dutch politician
Johanna Schaller-Klier (born 1952), retired German Olympic hurdler and Olympic gold medallist
Johanna Schopenhauer (1766–1838), German author
Johanna "Janneke" Schopman (born 1977), Dutch field hockey player
Johanna von Schoultz (1813–1863), Finnish opera singer
Johanna Schouten-Elsenhout (1910–1992), Surinamese poet and community leader
Johanna "Ans" Schut (born 1944), Dutch speed skater
Johanna "Jopie" Selbach (1918–1998), Dutch swimmer
Johanna Spyri (1827–1901), Swiss author of Heidi
Johanna Sundberg (1828–1910), Swedish ballerina
Johanna ter Steege (born 1961), Dutch actress
Johanna Talihärm (born 1993), Estonian biathlete
Johanna "Hannie" Termeulen (1929–2001), Dutch swimmer
Johanna Veenstra (1894–1933), American missionary
Johanna Vergouwen (1630–1714), Flemish Baroque painter and copyist
Johanna Petronella Vrugt (1905–1960), Dutch writer and poet with the pseudonym Anna Blaman
Johanna Waterous (born 1957), Canadian businesswoman
Johanna Wattier (1762–1827), Dutch actress
Johanna Westerdijk (1883–1961), Dutch plant pathologist, first female professor in the Netherlands
Jóhanna
Jóhanna Sigurðardóttir (born 1942), Iceland's first female Prime Minister and the world's first openly gay head of government of the modern era
Jóhanna Guðrún Jónsdóttir, a.k.a. Yohanna, Icelandic singer

Masculine name
Johanna Omolo (born 1989), Kenyan footballer

Fictional characters
Johanna, a character in many adaptations of the story of Sweeney Todd, named "Johanna Oakley" in the original version of the tale and "Johanna Barker" in Sondheim's musical adaptation
 a role in August Bournonville's comic ballet The Kermesse in Bruges
Johanna Mason, a character in the popular Hunger Games series, being mentioned without a name in the first novel and appearing as a main character in Catching Fire and Mockingjay.
Johanna Reyes, a character in the Divergent series beginning with Insurgent. She is the leader of the Amity faction.
Johanna, a playable character in the video game Heroes of the Storm.
Johanna, the motorcycle-shaped persona of Makoto Niijima in Persona 5.
Johanna, the titular character's mother in Hilda.

Name day
Latvia: 15 December
Hungary: 28 March
Finland: 21 July
Greece: 7 January
Poland: 31 May
Sweden: 21 July
Estonia: 15 August

See also
Jane (given name)
Joan (given name)
Joanna
Johannes
Joke (given name)

Feminine given names
Dutch feminine given names
Scandinavian feminine given names
German feminine given names
Hebrew feminine given names
Estonian feminine given names
Finnish feminine given names